Submarine Squadron 1 (also known as SUBRON 1) is a squadron of submarines of the United States Navy based at Joint Base Pearl Harbor–Hickam, Pearl Harbor, Hawai'i. The submarines that make up SUBRON 1 include:

History

Strategic deterrent
Between 1959 and 1964, SUBRON 1 operated as part of the US Navy's contribution to the United States' strategic nuclear deterrent. A total of five submarines designed to operate the SSM-N-8 Regulus cruise missile were stationed at Pearl Harbor to undertake deterrent patrols in the Pacific Ocean. The five boats of SUBRON 1 (4 diesel-electric and 1 nuclear-powered) maintained a constant presence, with at least four Regulus missiles at sea at all times for the five years of the weapon's use as part of the nuclear triad. SUBRON 1 was eventually replaced in this role by SUBRON 15, which operated seven ballistic missile submarines from 1965 onwards.

Strategic deterrent submarines

Commanders
Previous commanders have included Cecil D. Haney from June 2002 to July 2004 and Harry L. Ganteaume from October 2013 to March 2015.  Below is a list of all previous commanders:

 Captain R. S. Edwards - May 1941 to March 1942
 Captain E. F. Curtis - March 1942 to March 1943
 Captain M. M. Stephen - March 1943 to June 1943
 Captain C. W. Gray - June 1943 to August 1944
 Captain W. L. Hoffheins - August 1944 to October 1945
 Captain W. D. Wilkins - October 1945 to June 1946
 Captain R. J. Foley - June 1946 to April 1948
 Captain W. S. Stovall, Jr. - April 1948 to January 1950
 Captain R. R. McGregor - January 1950 to July 1950
 Captain D. L. Whelchel - July 1950 to August 1951
 Captain J. C. Dempsey - August 1951 to July 1952
 Captain T. W. Hogan - July 1952 to June 1953
 Captain M. E. Harrison - June 1953 to August 1954
 Captain D. G. Irvine - August 1954 to October 1955
 Captain C. C. Cole - October 1955 to July 1956
 Captain J. D. Fulp - July 1956 to July 1957
 Captain A. K. Tyree - July 1957 to July 1958
 Captain B. C. Hills - July 1958 to October 1959
 Captain R. F. Sellars - October 1959 to November 1960
 Captain D. G. Baer - November 1960 to September 1961
 Captain L. B. McDonald - September 1961 to August 1962
 Captain S. S. Mann - August 1962 to August 1963
 Captain R. K. Kaufman - August 1963 to September 1964
 Captain F. B. Clarke - September 1964 to September 1965
 Captain T. H. William - September 1965 to July 1966
 Captain D. A. Paolucci - July 1966 to July 1967
 Captain W. L. Siple - July 1967 to January 1969
 Captain R. B. Cowdrey - January 1969 to March 1970
 Captain J. B. Wilson - March 1970 to March 1971
 Captain R. S. Leddick - March 1971 to August 1972
 Captain T. L. Malone, Jr. - August 1972 to May 1973
 Captain R. W. Chewning - May 1973 to July 1974
 Captain R. R. Wight - July 1974 to August 1976
 Captain W. J. Holland, Jr. - August 1976 to June 1978
 Captain C. G. Foster - June 1978 to August 1980
 Captain R. F. Bacon - August 1980 to May 1982
 Captain A. H. Pauole - May 1982 to July 1984
 Captain A. L. Cheaure - July 1984 to August 1986 
 Captain R. A. Riddell - August 1986 to July 1988
 Captain E. D. Morrow - July 1988 to June 1990
 Captain C. A. Wiese - June 1990 to May 1992
 Captain S. A. Arndt - May 1992 to August 1994
 Captain D. P. Miller - August 1994 to July 1996
 Captain T. G. Kyle - July 1996 to August 1998
 Captain D. M. McCall - August 1998 to August 2000
 Captain R. L. Snead - August 2000 to July 2002
 Captain C. D. Haney - July 2002 to July 2004
 Captain M. A. Zieser - July 2004 to June 2006
 Captain S. G. Marr - June 2006 to June 2007
 Captain L. R. Hankins - June 2007 to July 2009
 Captain S. M. Robertson - July 2009 to February 2012
 Captain J. C. Childs - February 2012 to October 2013
 Captain H. L. Ganteaume - October 2013 to March 2015
 Captain T. A. Rexrode - March 2015 to January 2017
 Captain R. J. Seif - January 2017 to January 2019
 Captain Wesley Bringham - January 2019 to October 2019
 Captain Melvin R. Smith - October 2020 to August 2022
 Captain Aaron C. Peterson - August 2022 to present

 

The squadron was first established in May 1941 at New London, Connecticut. There were originally nineteen submarines in the squadron. On October 1, 1945, it moved to the Pacific Fleet at Pearl Harbor, Hawaii and has remained there ever since.

Notes

See also
 History of the United States Navy

External links
 Naval Station Pearl Harbor US Navy page.

Submarine squadrons of the United States Navy
Military units and formations established in 1941